The Will Lammert Prize was an East German art award named after the sculptor Will Lammert. Between 1962 and 1992, it was awarded at irregular intervals to young sculptors by the (East) German Academy of Arts. There were 13 laureates in total.

The prize, which was donated by Lammert's widow in 1957, was awarded for the first time on 5 January 1962, to Werner Stötzer. This made the Will Lammert Prize the first privately sponsored award in East Germany. According to its provisions, only sculptors under the age of 30 were eligible for the prize. The age restriction was later lifted, however.

Award winners 
 1962: Werner Stötzer
 1964: Wilfried Fitzenreiter
 1966: Wieland Förster
 1967: Gerhard Rommel
 1969: Margret Middell
 1971: Friedrich B. Henkel
 1973: Bernd Göbel
 1976: Christa Sammler
 1979: Regina Fleck
 1982: Sonja Eschefeld
 1985: Emerita Pansowowa
 1988: Robert Metzkes
 1992: Rolf Biebl

Literature 
 Complete list of the award winners: Horst-Jörg Ludwig (Ed.): Will Lammert (1892–1957) – Plastik und Zeichnungen. Akademie der Künste, Berlin 1992, S. 128.

References

German awards
Awards established in 1962
East German awards